Garadna is a village in Borsod-Abaúj-Zemplén county, Hungary.

Etymology
The name comes from Slavic/Early Slovak adjective gradná - "belonging to the castle", "an extramural settlement".  The name was adopted by Hungarians before the spiratization of Slavic /g/ to /h/.  See e.g. Veľká Hradná (Slovakia).

References

External links 
 Street map 

Populated places in Borsod-Abaúj-Zemplén County